The 2007 Copa América Final was the final match of the 2007 Copa América. It was held on 15 July 2007 in Maracaibo, Venezuela, between Brazil and Argentina. Brazil won 3–0, with goals from Júlio Baptista, a Roberto Ayala own goal and Dani Alves. Brazil won their eighth title, while Argentina could have won their fifteenth.

Background

It was the second consecutive final between Brazil and Argentina; Brazil had won the 2004 Final in a penalty shootout against Argentina. The match ended 2–2 after extra time: Kily González opened the scoring with a penalty, and Luisão headed an equaliser at the start of the second half. César Delgado put Argentina back into the lead with three minutes of normal time remaining, but Adriano equalised in added time. In the shootout, Brazil's Júlio César saved the first Argentine penalty by Andrés D'Alessandro while Gabriel Heinze missed, and defender Juan scored the winner.

Route to the final

Match

Officials
Paraguayan Carlos Amarilla was chosen to be the referee, having also refereed the 2004 Final. In the 2007 tournament he refereed two more matches, Uruguay against Peru, and Chile against Mexico, both of the first round.

Team selection
Of Argentina's team which took part in the 2004 Final, Roberto Abbondanzieri, Javier Zanetti, Gabriel Heinze, Roberto Ayala, Javier Mascherano, and Carlos Tevez started in the 2007 edition, with Lucho González a starter in 2004 and substitute in 2007. For Brazil, Juan and Maicon started both, with Diego a substitute in both.

Synopsis 
Brazil took the lead in the fourth minute through Júlio Baptista, set up by Elano. Thirty minutes later, however, Elano went off injured to be replaced by Dani Alves. Alves sent in a cross in the 40th minute, which Ayala deflected for an own goal past Abbondanzieri to double Brazil's lead at half time.

In the 59th minute, Argentina substituted defensive midfielder Esteban Cambiasso for attacking alternative Pablo Aimar. Ten minutes later, Brazil scored their third and final goal: Vágner Love began a counterattack, running up the pitch and setting up Alves to score.

Details

References

External links
Copa América 2007; rsssf.com
Copa America 2007 Final; football-lineups.com

1
Brazil national football team matches
Argentina national football team matches
Copa América finals
Sports competitions in Maracaibo
Argentina at the 2007 Copa América
Brazil at the 2007 Copa América
Argentina–Brazil football rivalry at Copa América
21st century in Maracaibo
July 2007 sports events in South America